Charles Beckham is an American politician currently serving in the Arkansas Senate from the 12th district. He won the seat after defeating Democrat incumbent Bruce Maloch 55.9% to 44.1%, thus flipping the district from Democratic to Republican. In the 2022 Republican primary for the seat, he was defeated by Magnolia City Council member Steve Crowell.

References

Arkansas Republicans
21st-century American politicians
Living people

Year of birth missing (living people)